Fabio Magrini (born 23 December 1965) is an Italian weightlifter. He competed in the men's heavyweight I event at the 1988 Summer Olympics.

References

External links
 

1965 births
Living people
Italian male weightlifters
Olympic weightlifters of Italy
Weightlifters at the 1988 Summer Olympics
Sportspeople from the Province of Verona
20th-century Italian people